Benjamin Rudolph (born August 29, 1957) is a former American football defensive tackle/defensive end in the National Football League (NFL). Rudolph was drafted in the third round (60th overall pick) of the 1981 NFL Draft by the New York Jets out of Long Beach State University.

References

External links
NFL.com player page
Stats

1957 births
Living people
People from Evergreen, Alabama
Players of American football from Alabama
American football defensive tackles
American football defensive ends
Long Beach State 49ers football players
New York Jets players